Dorst is a surname of Dutch origin (meaning thirst), and may refer to:

 Christopher Dorst (born 1956), American water polo player
 Doug Dorst (early–21st c.), American novelist, short story writer, and creative writing instructor
 H. Dorst (mid–20th c.), Indonesian football player
 Jean Dorst (1924–2001), French ornithologist.
 Marybeth Linzmeier Dorst (born 1963), American swimmer  
 Tankred Dorst (1925–2017), German playwright and storyteller

See also
Durst (surname)

Surnames of Dutch origin